Three ships and one shore establishment of the Royal Navy have borne the name HMS Osiris, after the Egyptian god Osiris:

  was an  launched in 1916 and sold in 1921.
  was an  launched in 1928 and sold in 1946, being broken up in 1952.
  was an  launched in 1962 and sold to Canada in 1992, where she was dismantled for spare parts and broken up that year.
  was a shore establishment in Egypt in the late 1940s/early 1950s. 

Royal Navy ship names